Hiroto Nakagawa may refer to:
 Hiroto Nakagawa (footballer, born 1994) (中川 寛斗), Japanese footballer
 Hiroto Nakagawa (footballer, born 2000) (中川 裕仁), Japanese footballer